Bergnäsets AIK is a Swedish football club located in Luleå in Norrbotten County. Their home colours are green and black, and when they play away, they wear red.

Background
Since their foundation Bergnäsets AIK has participated mainly in the middle and lower divisions of the Swedish football league system.  The club currently plays in Division 3 Norra Norrland which is the fifth tier of Swedish football. They play their home matches at the Bergsvallen in Luleå.

Bergnäsets AIK are affiliated to the Norrbottens Fotbollförbund.

Season to season

Attendances

In recent seasons Bergnäsets AIK have had the following average attendances:

Footnotes

External links
 Bergnäsets AIK – Official website
 Bergnäsets AIK Facebook

Sport in Luleå
Football clubs in Norrbotten County